Acton Lane Power Station was a power station in London NW10. The station, also known as Willesden power station, was located to the south of the Euston to Birmingham railway on a site bounded by Acton Lane, the Grand Union Canal and the Dudding Hill railway line. In later years the site was extended to the south side of the canal. The entire site is now occupied by Willesden Grid Supply Point buildings.

History
The first 'A' station was built by the Metropolitan Electric Supply Company Limited (METESCo) and commissioned in 1899. It was originally called Willesden power station but was later known as Acton Lane to distinguish it from another station called Willesden power station at Taylors Lane. METESCo supplied electricity to Finsbury, Holborn, Paddington, the City of Westminster, Acton, Greenford, Hanwell, Southall and Brentford.

The commissioning of the 'A' station enabled smaller less efficient power stations in central London to be closed or reconfigured as distribution substations. These included Manchester Square, Sardinia Street, Amberley Road (see below), Rathbone Place and Whitehall Court.

In 1903 METESCo experimented with pulverised fuel firing of some of its boilers. Coal was pulverised to a fine powder in ball mills. The advantage was intimate mixing of powdered coal and air giving better combustion and higher boiler efficiencies.

The station was taken over by the London Power Company Limited in 1925. It was one of four stations (the others being Bow, Deptford East and Grove Road Saint John's Wood) which continued following the formation of the London and Home Counties Joint Electricity Authority in 1925, which resulted in closure of many smaller stations in central London.

The later Acton Lane 'B' station had three concrete cooling towers and dominated the eastern end of  North Acton trading estate at Park Royal. Work on this began in 1950, initially for 56 MW. Coal was supplied by rail to sidings from the adjacent railway to the north. Other power stations nearby included Neasden (since demolished), Taylors Lane and Stonebridge Park (demolished).

In 1967 there were complaints from boaters that ash from Acton Lane power station was silting up the Grand Union canal. The CEGB denied they were depositing ash into the canal and said that ash was taken away by lorry. It did admit that ash from another power station was deposited into the canal from another station but that this had been closed in 1958.

The station closed on 31 October 1983 with a generating capacity of 150 MW.

Specification
The 'A' station had a high pressure (HP) plant and a low pressure (LP) plant. The HP plant had an installed capacity of 30 MW comprising a single 30 MW machine.

In 1923 the generating plant at the 'A' station comprised 2 × 1,500 kW and 2 × 3,000 kW reciprocating machines and 1 × 3,000 kW, 2 × 4,000 kW and 2 × 10,000 kW steam turbines, a total generating capacity of 40 MW. The boilers had a maximum capacity of 584,000 lb/hr (73.6 kg/s) of steam. The station had a total of 49,856 connections and a maximum load of 20,442 MW, supplied through a range of current and voltages:

 2-phase AC, 60 Hz, 100 & 200V
 3-phase AC, 60 Hz, 415 &240V
 3-phase AC, 50 Hz
 DC 200 & 100V, and 460 & 230V

In 1923 the station generated 38.69 GWh, and sold 29.62 GWh, providing an income of £271,812.

In 1954 the station generated 112.862 GWh. The HP boilers had an output capacity of 440,000 lb/h, and in 1954 burned 71,700 tons of coal. The LP plant had an installed capacity of 127.9 MW. In 1954 it generated 130.34 GWh. The LP boilers had an output capacity of 1,400,000 lb/h and in 1954 burned 133,300 tons of coal. The thermal efficiency of the LP plant was 14.24 percent, compared to 22.91 percent for the HP plant. The LP side was decommissioned in the late 1950s.

The electricity output from Acton Lane A power station was: 

By its final year of operation in 1963-64 the 'A' station had 1 × 30 MW generator. It produced 28 GWh of electricity in that year. The steam capacity of the boilers was 440,000 lb/hr (55.4 kg/s). The steam conditions at the turbine stop valve was 600 psi (41.4 bar). In 1963-64 the overall thermal efficiency of the A station was 13.06 per cent.

By  1963-64 the 'B' station had 5 × 30 MW generators. There were seven 240,000 lb/hr boilers with a total steam capacity of 1,680,000 lb/hr (211.7 kg/s). Steam conditions at the turbine stop valves was 600 psi (41.4 bar) and 454 °C. The boilers were chain grate stoked and in 1954 burned 27,100 tons of coal. In 1963-64 the overall thermal efficiency of the B station was 24.48 per cent, by the time of its closure the thermal efficiency had fallen to 14.47 per cent.

Electricity output from Acton Lane 'B' power station during its operational life was as follows.

Acton Lane B annual electricity output GWh.
Willesden Feeder station on the site comprises systems operating at 400 kV to/from Kensal Green substation; 275 kV to/from Ealing substation; 132 kV from Taylors Lane power station, Neasden feeder station, White City substation, North Pole feeder station; 66 kV to Townmead Road substation, Bulwer Street substation; and 22 kV to Acton Lane, Brentham new LUL, and Kimberley Road.

Film set
The disused power station was used as a film set in Aliens (1986) and as the 'Axis Chemical Works' in Batman (1989).

Amberley Road power station
The Metropolitan Electric Supply Company Limited also owned and operated a power station at Amberley Road in Westbourne Green adjacent to the Grand Union Canal (51.522632°N 0.192518°W). The station was first commissioned in March 1893. In 1923 the station had four 600 kW steam turbines supplied from boilers producing 96,000 lb/hr (12.1 kg/s) of steam. The station closed in 1926. Today the site is a substation connected to Aberdeen Place substation (132 kV) and to Moscow Road substation (22 kV).

References

External links

 Black-and-white Photo taken in April 1984 showing the cooling towers
 Colour photo of the cooling towers
 9 July 1939 aerial photograph

Coal-fired power stations in England
Former power stations in London
Demolished power stations in the United Kingdom
Former coal-fired power stations in the United Kingdom
Former power stations in England